"Live Fast, Die Young" may refer to:
 Live Fast, Die Young, a biography of James Dean
 Live Fast, Die Young (film), a 1958 film starring Mary Murphy and Norma Eberhardt
 Live Fast, Die Young (2008 film), a film by Christopher Showerman
 "Live Fast Die Young", a 1981 song by the US punk band Circle Jerks from the album Group Sex
 "Live Fast, Die Young" (song), a 2010 song by American rapper Rick Ross
 "Live fast, die young, and have a good-looking corpse", an oft-repeated quotation from the 1947 book  Knock on Any Door by Willard Motley, also found in the movie version of the book

See also 
 Live Fast, Love Hard, Die Young